Correntías Medias is a village in Alicante, Spain. It is part of the municipality of Orihuela

Controversies
The village is noted for its poor quality of healthcare. The PSOE denounced the village's medical centre because of multiple issues including lack of power in the building and rain leaking through the ceiling.

References

Towns in Spain
Populated places in the Province of Alicante
Vega Baja del Segura